Algodonite is a copper arsenide mineral with formula: Cu6As. It is a gray white metallic mineral crystallizing in the hexagonal system. It has a Mohs hardness of 4 and a specific gravity of 8.38 - 8.72.

It was first described in 1857 from the Algodones silver mine, Coquimbo, Chile.

References

Copper minerals
Arsenide minerals
Hexagonal minerals
Minerals in space group 194